The F-class submarines were a group of four submarines designed for the United States Navy by Electric Boat in 1909. F-1 and F-2 were built by Union Iron Works in San Francisco, while F-3 and F-4 were built by The Moran Company in Seattle, Washington.

Design
They were generally similar to the C-class and D-class submarines built by Electric Boat, but larger at 400 tons submerged vs. 337 tons for the D class. They were single-hulled boats with circular sections laid along the longitudinal axis. The E-class and the F-class submarines were the first US submarines to have bow planes. Like the E class, their early-model diesels had problems and were replaced in 1915.

The hull contained three compartments:

torpedo room with four 18 inch (450 mm) torpedo tubes,
control room with the ballast control valves, hydroplane controls and periscope
engine room with two diesel engines

The two diesel engines were clutched to shafts that turned electric motors that could also be used as generators for charging the batteries. The shafts also turned the screws. For submerged operation, the diesels were de-clutched and shut down, with the battery providing all of the submarine's power. The battery was an array of cells in rubber-lined, open-topped, steel jars.

These vessels included some features intended to increase underwater speed that were standard on US submarines of this era, including a small sail and a rotating cap over the torpedo tube muzzles. For extended surface runs, the small sail was augmented with a temporary piping-and-canvas structure. Apparently the "crash dive" concept had not yet been thought of, as this would take considerable time to deploy and dismantle. This remained standard through the N class, commissioned 1917-1918. Experience in World War I showed that this was inadequate in the North Atlantic weather, and earlier submarines serving overseas in that war (E class through L class) had their bridge structures augmented with a "chariot" shield on the front of the bridge. However, as the F class served in the Pacific, they did not receive this upgrade. Starting with the N class, built with lessons learned from overseas experience, US submarines had bridges more suited to surfaced operations in rough weather. The streamlined, rotating torpedo tube muzzle cap eliminated the drag that muzzle holes would otherwise cause. In the stowed position, the submarine appears to have no torpedo tubes, as the holes in the cap are covered by the bow stem. This feature remained standard through the K class, after which it was replaced with shutters that were standard through the 1950s.

History
All four F-class submarines spent their careers in the Pacific Fleet, primarily based in San Pedro Submarine Base , San Pedro, Los Angeles, California with a stint in Hawaii. F-4 was lost off Hawaii on 25 March 1915 due to a battery acid leak corroding the hull. F-1 and F-3 collided off San Diego on 17 December 1917, and F-1 was lost. F-2 and F-3 survived to be decommissioned and scrapped in 1922 to comply with the limits of the Washington Naval Treaty.

Vessels in class
 (originally named Carp, but renamed F-1 on 17 November 1911) was laid down on 23 August 1909, launched on 6 September 1911 and was commissioned on 19 June 1912. Sunk by collision with F-3, 17 December 1917.
 (originally named Barracuda, but renamed F-2 on 17 November 1911) was laid down on 23 August 1909, launched on 19 March 1912 and was commissioned on 25 June 1912. Reclassified as SS-21 on 17 July 1920, the submarine was decommissioned on 16 March 1922 and sold afterwards.
 (originally named Pickerel, but renamed F-3 on 17 November 1911) was laid down on 17 August 1909, launched on 6 January 1912 and was commissioned on 5 August 1912. Reclassified as SS-22 on 17 July 1920, the submarine was decommissioned on 15 March 1922 and sold afterwards.
 (originally named Skate, but renamed F-4 on 17 November 1911) was laid down on 21 August 1909, launched on 6 January 1912 and was commissioned on 3 May 1913. Foundered off Hawaii, 25 March 1915.

References

Notes

Sources
 Gardiner, Robert, Conway's All the World's Fighting Ships 1906–1921 Conway Maritime Press, 1985. .
 Friedman, Norman "US Submarines through 1945: An Illustrated Design History", Naval Institute Press, Annapolis:1995, .
Navsource.org early diesel submarines page

External links

Pigboats.com F-boats page

Submarine classes
 
 F class